Business to Arts is an Irish membership-based, charitable organisation that "brokers, enables and supports creative partnerships between businesses, individuals and the arts". Established in 1988, the stated mission of the organisation is to build "creative partnerships between arts and business; so that the creativity and acumen of both communities develop quality cultural experiences and world-class collaborations". Membership subscriptions by businesses and individuals form the primary source of funding for the organisation, together with funding from the Department of Tourism, Culture, Arts, Gaeltacht, Sport and Media.

History and activities 
Business to Arts was incorporated on 24 August 1988 under the name "Cothú. 

The "Business to Arts Awards" have been run by the organisation since 1991. In a partnership with the daa (formerly Dublin Airport Authority), the awards given each year are "original" commissioned sculptures.

Business to Arts has also developed a series of arts funds. Some of these funds have involved the likes of Accenture for the Women on Walls Campaign, Bank of Ireland for the Begin Together Arts Fund, Dublin Port Company for the Port Perspectives - Community Arts Programme, and Dublin City Council for The Docklands Arts Fund.

New Stream, a project operated by Business to Arts, was established in 2009 to "strengthen the skills of the Irish cultural sector to generate new funding streams from non-public sources more effectively", and was funded by Bank of America Merrill Lynch and the Department of Tourism, Culture, Arts, Gaeltacht, Sport and Media. As part of the programme, a 24-month "Arts' Fellowship programme", was initiated in partnership with Dublin City Council Culture Company.

"Fund it" is a crowdfunding website, run by Business to Arts, for creative projects in Ireland. As 2021, "Fund it" had reportedly helped raise over €5.2 million and supported over 1,200 creative projects.

References

External links
 Official homepage

Non-profit organisations based in the Republic of Ireland